Geranium pratense, the meadow crane's-bill or meadow geranium, is a species of flowering plant in the family Geraniaceae, native to Europe and Asia. It is extremely hardy to at least , reflecting its origins in the Altai Mountains of central Asia.

The leaves are deeply divided into 7-9 lobes and 3-6 inch wide and the flowers are pale blue, although getting paler into the centre. The flowers have 5 petals, which sometimes have veins. The stamens have pink-purple stalks with dark purple anthers.

Several cultivars are available for garden use, of which 'Mrs Kendall Clark' and 'Plenum violaceum' have gained the Royal Horticultural Society's Award of Garden Merit.

References

 MSUplants.com - Geranium pratense - Meadow Geranium

pratense
Plants described in 1753
Taxa named by Carl Linnaeus